Tresviso is a municipality located in the autonomous community of Cantabria, Spain. Alternatively, on the Cantabrian side there is a strenuous 3-hour hike from the N621 highway along the Deva featuring many switchbacks.

References

Municipalities in Cantabria